Wayne N. Cusic (April 14, 1905 – November 20, 1993) was an American college football and basketball player and coach. He served as the head football coach at McNeese State University in 1940 and 1945.

References

1905 births
1993 deaths
American men's basketball players
Illinois College Blueboys baseball players
Illinois College Blueboys football players
Illinois College Blueboys basketball players
McNeese Cowboys football coaches
McNeese Cowboys basketball coaches